Hans Jacobson (March 17, 1947 – July 9, 1984) was a Swedish modern pentathlete, fencer and Olympic Champion. He competed at the 1976 Summer Olympics in Montreal, where he won a gold medal in épée with the Swedish team. He originally won a bronze medal in the team competition at the 1968 Summer Olympics along with Hans Jacobson and Hans-Gunnar Liljenvall. However, he was stripped of the medal after Liljenvall failed a drug test (for alcohol).

References

1947 births
1984 deaths
Sportspeople from Stockholm
Swedish male épée fencers
Swedish male modern pentathletes
Olympic fencers of Sweden
Olympic modern pentathletes of Sweden
Modern pentathletes at the 1968 Summer Olympics
Fencers at the 1976 Summer Olympics
Fencers at the 1980 Summer Olympics
Olympic gold medalists for Sweden
Olympic medalists in fencing
Medalists at the 1976 Summer Olympics
Djurgårdens IF fencers